Delhi Division is the only administrative and revenue division in the Delhi which consists of eleven Revenue districts. Civil Lines in Central Delhi district is the headquarters of the Delhi division. Delhi Division is headed by an IAS officer of the rank of Divisional Commissioner (Principal Secretary of Revenue). The Divisional Commissioner report to the Chief Secretary of Delhi. The present Divisional Commissioner of Delhi is Mr. Sanjeev Khirwar (IAS) since January 2019.

List of districts and Sub-divisions 

Below is the list of 11 Districts and 33 sub-divisions of Delhi (with effect from September 2012).

References

Delhi